Agrofert is a Czech conglomerate holding company headquartered in Prague, Czech Republic. It operates agriculture, food, chemical, construction, logistics, forestry, energy and mass media industries in the European Union and China with over 250 subsidiary companies.

Most of them are owned directly by AGROFERT, a.s., the minor part of the portfolio consists of companies in which the maternal company has substantial influence. The companies of AGROFERT, a.s. operate mostly in central Europe: in the Czech Republic, Slovakia, Germany and Hungary. Furthermore, it operates in another 18 countries and 4 continents. In 2012 the consolidated turnover of the company reached 132.5 billion Kč. AGROFERT, a.s. is one of the biggest companies in the Czech Republic. Agricultural companies of the conglomerate manage 386,1 square miles of land in the Czech Republic. (Majority of the land is rented, that means 1,26 % of Czech land or 2,84 % of Czech arable land.)  Andrej Babiš has directed the conglomerate until January 2014 and owned it until 2017, he was forced to  transfer ownership of company to two trust funds AB private trust I and AB private trust II controlled by his family and lawyers in order to comply with the new conflict of interest legislation passed by the Parliament. In 2017 the conglomerate employed 33 thousand people, 22 thousand of them in CR.

History
Agrofert was founded by Czech state company Petrimex (where Andrej Babiš worked as salesman), on January 25, 1993, and in its current form on July 1, 2000. The company was founded in 1993 by Petrimex. Andrej Babiš was its CEO until January 2014 when he became Finance Minister of the Czech Republic, and also its sole owner until 2017.

In November 2013, Agrofert bought Londa, which owns Rádio Impuls, Rádio Rock Zone 105.9 and Český Impuls.

Speculations in January 2014 also indicated that the holding company was considering buying Prima or Nova television.

In June 2022, it was announced that Borealis is to sell its fertilizers division to Agrofert for €810m.

Financials

References

External links 

Chemical companies of the Czech Republic
Privately held companies
Agriculture companies established in 1993
Chemical companies established in 1993
Companies based in Prague
Czech brands
Andrej Babiš
Agriculture companies of the Czech Republic
Czech companies established in 1993